Chitin disaccharide deacetylase (chitobiose amidohydolase, COD, chitin oligosaccharide deacetylase, chitin oligosaccharide amidohydolase) is an enzyme with systematic name 2-(acetylamino)-4-O-(2-(acetylamino)-2-deoxy-beta-D-glucopyranosyl)-2-deoxy-D-glucopyranose acetylhydrolase. This enzyme catalyses the following chemical reaction

 2-(acetylamino)-4-O-[2-(acetylamino)-2-deoxy-beta-D-glucopyranosyl]-2-deoxy-beta-D-glucopyranose + H2O  2-(acetylamino)-4-O-(2-amino-2-deoxy-beta-D-glucopyranosyl)-2-deoxy-beta-D-glucopyranose + acetate

Chitin oligosaccharide deacetylase is present in  Vibrio strains.

References

External links 
 

EC 3.5.1